SS Cardinal Gibbons was a Liberty ship built in the United States during World War II. She was named after Cardinal Gibbons, an American prelate of the Catholic Church. He served as Apostolic Vicar of North Carolina from 1868 to 1872, Bishop of Richmond from 1872 to 1877, and as ninth Archbishop of Baltimore from 1877 until his death in 1921. Gibbons was elevated to the rank of cardinal in 1886.

Construction
Cardinal Gibbons was laid down on 8 September 1942, under a Maritime Commission (MARCOM) contract, MCE hull 920, by the Bethlehem-Fairfield Shipyard, Baltimore, Maryland; she was sponsored by Mrs. N.J. Nelligan, the sister-in-law of Monsignor Nelligan of the Baltimore Cathedral, and was launched on 10 October 1942.

History
She was allocated to Sword Line Inc. on 23 October 1942 and then Marine Transport Lines on June 28, 1943.  On 29 October 1948, she was laid up in the James River Reserve Fleet, Jones Point, New York. On 13 October 1949, she was laid up in National Defense Reserve Fleet, Beaumont, Texas. On 14 October 1957, she was laid up in National Defense Reserve Fleet, Mobile, Alabama. On 2 November 1970, she was sold for scrapping to Union Minerals & Alloys Corp., for $41,137. She was removed from the fleet on 23 November 1970.

References

Bibliography

 
 
 
 

 

Liberty ships
Ships built in Baltimore
1942 ships
Hudson River Reserve Fleet
Beaumont Reserve Fleet
Mobile Reserve Fleet